Burn Notice is an American television action-drama series created by Matt Nix and starring Jeffrey Donovan, Gabrielle Anwar, Bruce Campbell, and Sharon Gless. The second season premiered July 10, 2008. The season was split into two parts, with episodes 1–9 airing in the summer of 2008 and episodes 10–16 being broadcast in early 2009.

A burn notice is a document issued by intelligence agencies to discredit or announce the dismissal of agents or sources who are considered to have become unreliable. The television series is a first-person narrative (including frequent stream of consciousness voice-overs providing nuggets of exposition) from the viewpoint of covert-operations agent Michael Westen, played by Jeffrey Donovan. Michael Westen often delivers tips on unrelated subject matters, such as on burglar-proofing houses or getting promoted during commercial breaks.

Season overview 
The second season of Burn Notice continues the plot lines of the first season. Michael Westen had struggled to find out why he had been burned and by whom. Westen continues his work as an unlicensed private investigator and freelance spy for anyone in town who can pay him any money to fund his investigation into his situation as a blacklisted agent. Westen battles and outwits an array of mobsters, con artists, contract killers, professional thieves, drug traffickers, arms dealers and kidnappers. Michael must also battle personal demons, chief among which is his relationship with Fiona.

Season 2 introduces a mysterious woman named "Carla" (Tricia Helfer), an agent of the organization behind Michael's burn notice who is now trying to get him to work for that organization. Although he resists, she assigns him various tasks (which he later learns are preparation for an assassination), while he also attempts to find out who she is. She often coerces him into working for her by threatening the people he cares about with violence. Midway through the season, Michael is almost assassinated by an unknown group. Carla gets the assignment to discover who placed the hit, as the mysterious assassin also killed the operative involved in her assassination, while Michael digs around for the mastermind to find what could be either a potential ally or a dangerous new enemy.

Carla's operation is sabotaged by a rogue agent in her organization, and Michael is assigned to find out who it was: Victor Stricker-Epps (Michael Shanks), another agent of the organization who was trying to destroy them from within after he learned that Carla had his wife and child killed as part of his recruitment. He also reveals that Carla is trying to kill them both because Victor has proof that Carla is corrupt: using the organization's resources for personal profit and to settle old vendettas, and Michael is helping him. At the end of Season 2, after Carla is killed by Fiona and Michael kills Victor in an act of mercy, he has an encounter with Carla's superior, simply known as "Management" (John Mahoney).  Putting the pieces together, Michael realizes that Management falsified records to paint him as both corrupt and unreliable, forcing the government to burn him.  When Michael demands Management leave him alone, Management complies. While it frees Michael from their grasp, it also removes the organization's protection, which now exposes Michael to police attention and allows enemies he made as a U.S. covert operative to track him down.

Cast 

Jeffrey Donovan returned as the still-burned spy Michael Westen.  Gabrielle Anwar reprised her role as ex-IRA operative Fiona Glenanne, and Bruce Campbell returned as ex-Navy SEAL Sam Axe.  Sharon Gless also returned, as Madeline Westen, Michael's mother.

The second season saw even more recurring guests than the first. The most prominent of these was Tricia Helfer, who appeared in many episodes as Michael's handler, Carla. Paul Tei also made several appearances returning as money-launderer Barry Burkowski. Seth Peterson returned as Michael's brother, Nate Westen. Michael Shanks was introduced as wrangler Victor Stecker-Epps. Silas Weir Mitchell made two appearances as the quirky arms dealer Seymour. Marc Macaulay and Brandon Morris returned for one episode as Agents Harris and Lane, two FBI agents who were formerly in charge of Michael's surveillance. Agent Jason Bly, another FBI agent, also returned for one episode, portrayed by Alex Carter.  Gary Weeks made various appearances as Campbell, Fiona's boyfriend, while Audrey Landers made a single appearance in her previous role as Sam's girlfriend, Veronica.  Virgil Watkins, a former client, made an appearance, portrayed by Chris Ellis.  Various other characters were introduced, who later became important recurring characters.  These included John Mahoney as Management, Tim Matheson as Michael's former mentor-turned-assassin "Dead" Larry Sizemore, and Jay Karnes as arms dealer Tyler Brennen.  Notable one-time guest stars included Kevin Alejandro, Erick Avari, Rob Benedict, Assaf Cohen, Patrick Fabian, Oded Fehr, Method Man, Larry Miller, Amy Pietz, Clarence Williams III, and Fawad Siddiqui.

Episodes

References 
Season 2 on IGN

Footnotes

External links 
 
 

2008 American television seasons
2009 American television seasons